Skhour Rehamna is a town in Rehamna Province, Marrakesh-Safi, Morocco. According to the 2004 census it has a population of 4,352.

References

Populated places in Rehamna Province